The Italian Riviera or Ligurian Riviera is the narrow coastal strip in Italy which lies between the Ligurian Sea and the mountain chain formed by the Maritime Alps and the Apennines. Longitudinally it extends from the border with France and the French Riviera (or Côte d'Azur) near Ventimiglia (a former customs post) eastwards to Capo Corvo (also known as Punta Bianca) which marks the eastern end of the Gulf of La Spezia and is close to the regional border between Liguria and Tuscany. The Italian Riviera thus includes nearly all of the coastline of Liguria. Historically the "Riviera" extended further to the west, through what is now French territory as far as Marseille.

The Italian Riviera crosses all four Ligurian provinces and their capitals Genoa, Savona, Imperia and La Spezia, with a total length of about 350 km (218 miles). It is customarily divided into a western section, the Ponente Riviera, and an eastern section, the Levante Riviera, the point of division being the apex of the Ligurian arc at Voltri. It has about 1.6 million inhabitants, and most of the population is concentrated within the coastal area. Its mild climate draws an active tourist trade in the numerous coastal resorts, which include Alassio, Bonassola, Bordighera, Camogli, Cinque Terre, Lerici, Levanto, Noli, Portofino, Porto Venere, Santa Margherita Ligure, Sanremo, San Fruttuoso, and Sestri Levante. It is also known for its historical association with international celebrity and artistic visitors; writers and poets like Percy Bysshe Shelley, Lord Byron, Ezra Pound, and Ernest Hemingway were inspired by the beauty and spirit of Liguria.

As a tourist centre, the Italian Riviera benefits from over 300 days of sunshine per year, and is known for its beaches, colourfully painted towns, natural environment, food, and luxury villas and hotels, as well as for its popular resort facilities, major yachting and cruising areas with several marinas, festivals, golf courses, sailing, rock climbing and scenic views of centuries old farmhouses and cottages.

Industries are concentrated in and around Genoa, Savona, and along the shores of the Gulf of La Spezia. Genoa and La Spezia are Italy's leading shipyards; La Spezia is Italy's major naval base, and Savona is a major centre of the Italian iron industry. Chemical, textile, and food industries are also important.

A number of streets and palaces in the center of Genoa and the Cinque Terre National Park (which includes Cinque Terre, Portovenere, and the islands Palmaria, Tino and Tinetto) are two of Italy's 58 World Heritage Sites.

Overview
The Riviera's centre is Genoa, which divides it into two main sections: the Riviera di Ponente (“the coast of the setting sun”), extending westwards from Genoa to the French border; and the Riviera di Levante (“the coast of the rising sun”) between Genoa and Capo Corvo.

It is known for its mild climate and its reputation for a relaxed way of life, old fishing ports, and landscapes. It has been a popular destination for travellers and tourists since the time of Byron and Percy Shelley.

Many villages and towns in the area are internationally known, such as Portofino, Bordighera, Lerici and the Cinque Terre.

The part of the Riviera di Ponente centred on Savona, is called the Riviera delle Palme (the Riviera of palms); the part centred on Sanremo, is the Riviera dei Fiori, after the long-established flower growing industry.

Places on or near the Italian Riviera include:

UNESCO World Heritage Sites 
The Italian Riviera contains the following UNESCO World Heritage Sites:
 Genoa: Le Strade Nuove and the system of the Palazzi dei Rolli
 Portovenere, Cinque Terre, and the Islands (Palmaria, Tino and Tinetto)

Gardens 

 Giardini Botanici Hanbury, Mortola Inferiore, Ventimiglia, Liguria.
 Giardino all'italiana Cervara Abbey, Santa Margherita Ligure, Liguria.
 Villa Durazzo-Pallavicini, Pegli, Genoa, Liguria.
 Villa Durazzo-Centurione, Santa Margherita Ligure, Liguria.
 Villa Grimaldi Fassio, Nervi, Genoa, Liguria.
 Villa Saluzzo Serra, Nervi, Genoa, Liguria.

Events and festivals 
 Carnevalöa - Carnival of Loano 
 Barcarolata in Sestri Levante
 Sanremo in Fiore - Corso Fiorito - Carnival of Sanremo   
 Euroflora in Nervi Genoa
 Festival Internazionale del Balletto e della Musica in Nervi Genoa
 Festival della Scienza in Genoa
 Genoa International Boat Show
 Premio Paganini in Genoa
 Sanremo Music Festival
 Rallye Sanremo
 Riviera International Film Festival
 Milan-Sanremo annual cycling race
 Palio Marinaro di San Pietro in Genoa
 Regatta of the Historical Marine Republics in Genoa
 Giro d'Italia cycling race

Yacht clubs 
 Yacht Club Italiano, Genoa
 Yacht Club Tigullio, Santa Margherita Ligure, Genoa
 Yacht Club Rapallo, Rapallo, Genoa
 Yacht Club Marina di Loano, Loano, Savona
 Yacht Club Imperia, Imperia
 Yacht Club Sanremo, Sanremo, Imperia

Typical cuisine, food and wine 
 Pesto
 Trofie al Pesto 
 Trenette al Pesto   	
 Mandilli  al Pesto 
 Pansoti alla salsa di noci
 Focaccia Genovese
 Focaccia di Recco (focaccia col formaggio)
 Focaccia con le cipolle
 Focaccia con le olive
 Farinata di ceci
 Taggiasca olives (Taggia)
 Spumante Bisson Abissi
 Sciacchetrà
 Pigato
 Rossese

Painters 
 Andrea Ansaldo (1584–1638)
 Bernardo Strozzi (1582-1644)
 Gioacchino Assereto (1600–1649)
 Giovanni Lorenzo Bertolotto (1640–1721) 
 Giovan Battista Gaulli (Baciccio) (1639–1709)

Healthcare 
 Sanremo Hospital
 Imperia Hospital
 Santa Maria di Misericordia Hospital, Albenga
 Santa Corona Hospital, Pietra Ligure
 San Paolo Hospital, Savona
 La Colletta Hospital, Arenzano
 Evangelico Hospital, Voltri, Genoa 
 Antero Micone Hospital, Sestri Ponente, Genoa
 Villa Scassi Hospital, Sampierdarena, Genoa
 Galliera Hospital, Genoa
 San Martino Hospital, Genoa
 Villa Montallegro Private Clinic, Genoa
 Istituto Giannina Gaslini, Genoa
 Sant'Antonio Hospital, Recco
 Lavagna Hospital
 Sestri Levante Hospital
 Sant'Andrea Hospital, La Spezia

Islands of Liguria 
 Bergeggi
 Isola Gallinara
 Palmaria
 Tino
 Tinetto
 Scola

See also
 French Riviera
 Portuguese Riviera

References

External links 

 Riviera dei Fiori, a sea of colors

 
Riviera
Ligurian Sea
Seaside resorts in Italy